Bosea lathyri is a Gram-negative, rod-shaped bacteria from the genus of Bosea.

References

External links
Type strain of Bosea lathyri at BacDive -  the Bacterial Diversity Metadatabase

Hyphomicrobiales
Bacteria described in 2012